James Erik "Jim" Johnson (born August 9, 1962) is an American ice hockey coach and former player, most recently an assistant coach for the San Antonio Rampage. Johnson played junior hockey before playing for University of Minnesota Duluth with Brett Hull in 1984. He graduated from Robbinsdale Cooper High School in 1980. During his career Johnson played for the Pittsburgh Penguins, Minnesota North Stars, Dallas Stars, Washington Capitals and Phoenix Coyotes.

Career
A defenseman, Johnson was signed as a free agent in 1985 by the Pittsburgh Penguins. In 1989 he was awarded the Aldege "Baz" Bastien Memorial Good Guy Award. He played for the Penguins until he was traded early in the 1990–91 NHL season to the Minnesota North Stars. He followed the North Stars franchise when it moved to Dallas in 1993, and played with them until the trade deadline of the 1993–94 NHL season, when he was dealt to the Washington Capitals. Johnson played for two full seasons with the Capitals before signing with the Phoenix Coyotes as a free agent in 1996, and retired two years later.  After retirement Johnson became a youth hockey coach in the state of Arizona. In that time he coached the VOSHA (Valley of the Sun Hockey Association) Mustangs to a USA Hockey Amateur National Championship back in 2005. later on he became the director of the P.F. Chang's hockey club and Partner / Co-Founder of flexxCOACH.com.

On November 29, 2011, he replaced Bob Woods as an assistant coach of the Washington Capitals.

On July 10, 2012, general manager Doug Wilson and head coach Todd McLellan named Johnson an assistant coach of the San Jose Sharks.

On April 20, 2015, the team announced fired head coach Todd McLellan, assistant coaches Jim Johnson and Jay Woodcroft, as well as video coordinator Brett Heimlich. On June 25, 2015, the Edmonton Oilers appointed Jim Johnson and Jay Woodcroft as assistant coaches, rejoining the recently hired head coach Todd McLellan in Edmonton. The Oilers relieved Johnson and fellow assistant Ian Herbers of their coaching duties on April 27, 2018.

In 2019, Johnson was hired as an assistant coach with the San Antonio Rampage in the American Hockey League.

Career statistics

Regular season and playoffs

International

References

External links
 

1962 births
Living people
American men's ice hockey defensemen
Arizona Coyotes coaches
Dallas Stars players
Edmonton Oilers coaches
Ice hockey coaches from Minnesota
Minnesota Duluth Bulldogs men's ice hockey players
Minnesota North Stars players
People from New Hope, Minnesota
Phoenix Coyotes players
Pittsburgh Penguins players
St. Paul Vulcans players
San Jose Sharks coaches
Tampa Bay Lightning coaches
Undrafted National Hockey League players
Washington Capitals coaches
Washington Capitals players
Ice hockey players from Minnesota